Kelly Andrews was the Co-Chair of the Green Party in Northern Ireland.

Andrews studied at Queen's University Belfast.  After working in community development, Andrews joined the Green Party in 2003, and was elected Co-Chair in 2005.  She also holds the title of National Coordinator for the Green Party Ireland, and runs the Green's constituency office in North Down.  Andrews is additionally a member of the Parades Commission.

References

Year of birth missing (living people)
Living people
Green Party in Northern Ireland politicians
Academics of Queen's University Belfast
Leaders of political parties in Northern Ireland